British security forces may refer to:

British Armed Forces, the military of the United Kingdom
British intelligence agencies
Law enforcement in the United Kingdom, the police and law enforcement agencies of the United Kingdom